Naved Yasin (born 15 July 1987) is a Pakistani cricketer. He has played in more than 100 first-class cricket matches since his debut in 2007, appearing domestically for several different teams, including Multan, State Bank of Pakistan, Khan Research Laboratories, Rawalpindi, and National Bank of Pakistan. He has also represented Pakistan at Under-19 and A-team level.

References

External links
 
 Naved Yasin at the Pakistan Cricket Board official website

1987 births
Living people
Pakistani cricketers
Lahore cricketers
National Bank of Pakistan cricketers
Rawalpindi cricketers
People from Vehari District
Lahore Qalandars cricketers
Southern Punjab (Pakistan) cricketers